Uspenovka is a village in the Aktobe Region of western Kazakhstan.

References

Populated places in Aktobe Region